Fred Irvin Diamond (born November 19, 1964) is a mathematician, known for his role in proving the modularity theorem for elliptic curves. His research interest is in modular forms and Galois representations.

Diamond received his B.A. from the University of Michigan in 1984, and received his Ph.D. in mathematics from Princeton University in 1988 as a doctoral student of Andrew Wiles. He has held positions at Brandeis University and Rutgers University, and is currently a professor at King's College London.

Diamond is the author of several research papers, and is also a coauthor along with Jerry Shurman of A First Course in Modular Forms, in the Graduate Texts in Mathematics series published by Springer-Verlag.

References

External links
 Fred Diamond's website

1964 births
Living people
Number theorists
20th-century American mathematicians
21st-century American mathematicians
Princeton University alumni
University of Michigan alumni
Ohio State University faculty
Brandeis University faculty
Academics of King's College London
Place of birth missing (living people)
Nationality missing
Fermat's Last Theorem